The Extremo Norte do Tocantins Extractive Reserve is an extractive reserve in the state of Tocantins, Brazil.

Location

The Extremo Norte do Tocantins Extractive Reserve is divided between the municipalities of Sampaio (6.12%) and Carrasco Bonito (93.88%) in the state of Tocantins.
The reserve lies to the north of the TO-201 highway, south of the Tocantins River.

History

The Extremo Norte do Tocantins Extractive Reserve was created by federal decree 535 of 20 May 1992.
On 9 December 2005 the Minister of the Environment appointed representatives of agencies and NGOs to elaborate the proposal for occupying the territory of the reserve.
The deliberative council was created on 23 May 2011.
The reserve is administered by the Chico Mendes Institute for Biodiversity Conservation (ICMBio).
It is classed as IUCN protected area category VI (protected area with sustainable use of natural resources).
Its purpose is to protect the livelihoods and culture of the traditional extractive population, and ensure the sustainable use of natural resources of the unit.

Economy

As of 2009 the population of the reserve was fairly young. 
About 25% of the population is illiterate and 32% have no more than three years of education, mostly women. 
About 30% of girls do not attend school but help the family in production activities.
The reserve is served by health centres in the Carrasco Bonito municipal seat.
The main economic activity is processing and marketing of babassu palm fruit, mainly by the women. 
The men cultivate rice, beans, maize and cassava, mainly for their family consumption.

A 2015 study reported that after 22 years the families of the reserve still lived outside it in surrounding communities.
The result had been constant competition for resources and disputes with farmers, and steady clearance of the babassu to expand pasturage for livestock.

Notes

Sources

1992 establishments in Brazil
Extractive reserves of Brazil
Protected areas of Tocantins